Joel Smith (born 25 February 1996) is a professional Australian rules footballer playing for the Melbourne Football Club in the Australian Football League (AFL). He played Australian rules football at a young age before switching sports to basketball where he represented Australia at under-19 level. The son of former  and  player, Shaun Smith, he followed in his fathers footsteps when he was recruited by Melbourne in 2015 as a category B rookie. After spending his first AFL season playing in the reserves, he made his AFL debut in the opening round of the 2017 season.

Early life
Smith is the son of former  and  player, Shaun Smith. He played Australian rules football at a young age, playing with Taylor Lakes from under ten level, where he won two best and fairests, before moving to the Maribyrnong Park Football Club for the under-16 season, he then switched sports to basketball. He had a successful career in basketball where he represented Australia at under-19 level and played with the Geelong Supercats in the South East Australian Basketball League in 2015.

AFL career
Smith was signed by the Melbourne Football Club in October 2015 as a category B rookie and was eligible to join Melbourne's list immediately as he hadn't been registered in an Australian rules football competition for at least three years. After four matches in the VFL, he was sidelined for over two months due to a groin injury. After returning from injury to the VFL, he played the remainder of the season including the grand final loss against  at Etihad Stadium.

Described as one of the standouts at training during the 2017 pre-season by AFL Media journalist, Ben Guthrie, Smith played in the opening two matches of the JLT Community Series. He was forced to miss the week three match against  at Domain Stadium due to a toe injury. Despite the injury, he was promoted to the senior list in place of Mitch King who was on the long-term injury list, and Smith subsequently made his debut in the thirty point win against  at Etihad Stadium in the opening round of the season. During the first quarter, he dislocated his shoulder and was forced to miss the remainder of the match.

Statistics
Updated to the end of the 2022 season.

|-
| 2017 ||  || 44
| 3 || 0 || 0 || 12 || 14 || 26 || 2 || 8 || 0.0 || 0.0 || 4.0 || 4.7 || 8.7 || 0.7 || 2.7
|-
| 2018 ||  || 44
| 8 || 1 || 2 || 46 || 48 || 94 || 29 || 31 || 0.1 || 0.3 || 5.8 || 6.0 || 11.8 || 3.6 || 3.9
|-
| 2019 ||  || 44
| 0 || – || – || – || – || – || – || – || – || – || – || – || – || – || –
|-
| 2020 ||  || 44
| 7 || 0 || 0 || 23 || 15 || 38 || 9 || 10 || 0.0 || 0.0 || 3.3 || 2.1 || 5.4 || 1.3 || 1.4
|-
| 2021 ||  || 44
| 3 || 0 || 0 || 11 || 9 || 20 || 9 || 4 || 0.0 || 0.0 || 3.7 || 3.0 || 6.7 || 3.0 || 1.3
|-
| 2022 ||  || 44
| 7 || 0 || 0 || 30 || 18 || 48 || 14 || 12 || 0.0 || 0.0 || 4.3 || 2.6 || 6.9 || 2.0 || 1.7
|- class=sortbottom
! colspan=3 | Career
! 28 !! 1 !! 2 !! 122 !! 104 !! 226 !! 63 !! 65 !! 0.0 !! 0.1 !! 4.4 !! 3.7 !! 8.1 !! 2.3 !! 2.3
|}

Notes

References

External links

1996 births
Living people
Melbourne Football Club players
Casey Demons players
Australian rules footballers from Victoria (Australia)